The epithet "the Grim" may refer to:

 Archibald Campbell, 7th Earl of Argyll (c. 1575–1638), also called "Gillesbuig Grumach" ("Archibald the Grim"), Scottish politician and military leader
 Archibald Douglas, 3rd Earl of Douglas (1328–1400), Scottish magnate
 Selim I (1465/1466/1470–1520), Sultan of the Ottoman Empire
 Hogun, a Marvel Comics character

See also
 Grim Tuesday, a character from the Keys to the Kingdom children's book series
 Chris Reitsma (born 1977), former Major League Baseball pitcher nicknamed "the Grim Reitsma"
 List of people known as the Cruel

Lists of people by epithet